Akasha is the third album by American composer Bill Laswell to be issued under the moniker Divination. It was released on March 28, 1995, by Subharmonic.

Track listing

Personnel 
Adapted from the Akasha liner notes.

Musicians
Anton Fier – effects and producer (1.3)
Grand Mixer DXT – turntables (2.1, 2.3)
Mick Harris – effects and producer(1.4)
Haruomi Hosono – drum programming and effects (1.2, 2.2)
Lydia Kavanaugh – vocals (1.3)
Bill Laswell – bass, effects, drum programming, producer and mixing (1.1, 1.2, 2.1-2.3), editing

Technical
Layng Martine – assistant engineer and editing (1.1, 1.2, 2.1-2.3)
Magno – cover art
Robert Musso – engineering and programming (1.1, 1.2, 2.1-2.3)

Release history

References

External links 
 
 Akasha at Bandcamp

1995 albums
Bill Laswell albums
Albums produced by Anton Fier
Albums produced by Mick Harris
Albums produced by Bill Laswell
Subharmonic (record label) albums